The 1905 Clemson Tigers football team represented Clemson Agricultural College—now known as Clemson University—during the 1905 Southern Intercollegiate Athletic Association football season. Under first year head coach Eddie Cochems, the team posted a 3–2–1 record.  Puss Derrick was the team captain. John de Saulles rated Clemson as the third best team in the SIAA.

Schedule

References

Clemson
Clemson Tigers football seasons
Clemson Tigers football